Ohly is a surname. Notable people with the surname include:

 Lars Ohly (born 1957), Swedish politician
 William Ohly (1883–1955), British ethnographic art collector and gallery owner

German-language surnames
Swedish-language surnames